Phyllis M. Christian (born 1956) is a Ghanaian lawyer and consultant who has been called "one of the most influential women in Ghana". A lawyer by training (the fourth generation of her family to enter the legal profession), she is also the founder, chief executive officer and managing consultant of ShawbellConsulting, based in Accra. Her grandfather George Alfred Grant, popularly known as Paa Grant, was one of the founding fathers of Ghana.

Background

Education and early career
Phyllis Maria Christian was born in Ghana, the elder daughter of high-court lawyer Howard J. Christian and his wife Sarah (née Grant, whose father Paa Grant was the founding president of the United Gold Coast Convention, which fought for Ghanaian independence), and the fourth of her parents' five children. Her father was the son of Dominica-born barrister George James Christian (1869–1940). She was educated at Holy Child School in Cape Coast (1967–74), and from 1974 to 1977 at the University of Ghana, Legon, where she earned a B.A. in Philosophy and Literature, before going on to study and qualify as a lawyer at Ghana School of Law (1978–81).

She was then employed providing legal and other professional services in local and international corporations, and in 1983 went to the US, where she lived for a while in Boston. On returning to Ghana, she worked as a senior manager at Price Waterhouse (December 1989–June 1999) and Executive Director at Ernst & Young (July 1999–April 2002).

ShawbellConsulting
In June 2002 Christian founded ShawbellConsulting, an Accra-based company providing legal and management consultancy services. In her role as chief executive officer, Christian (whose specialist practice areas are Corporate and Energy) has led the company to win a number of awards, being adjudged best law consulting firm of the year at the Offshore Ghana Oil and Gas Awards in 2014–15, among other accolades.

Other activities
As an advocate of incentives for indigenous firms, Christian has written for such outlets as the Daily Graphic, and endorses plans for legislation "to require that at least 70 per cent of all government, taxpayer-financed contracts and procurements be executed by local corporate entities" and a policy requiring a specified percentage be sourced "from entities owned by women, persons with disability, and those established under the Youth Enterprise Fund".

In a voluntary capacity she has been a board member of a number of organisations, including Sharecare Ghana (Sharecare4U) and the independent not-for-profit Institute for Democratic Governance (IDEG).

Christian appeared in the documentary film The Election Petition, which deals with the processes leading up to, during and after the election petition that was filed after Ghana's 2012 general elections.

She chairs the Ethics Committee of the Ghana Football Association (GFA), and in 2021 was appointed to the Ghana Advisory Board of Tullow Oil.

References

External links
 Paul Adom-Otchere, "Exclusive interview with Phyllis Maria Christian; founder Shawbell Consulting", Good Evening Ghana, 23 June 2016.

1956 births
Living people
University of Ghana alumni
Ghana School of Law alumni
Ghanaian women lawyers
Management consultants
20th-century Ghanaian lawyers
21st-century Ghanaian lawyers
Alumni of Holy Child High School, Ghana
20th-century women lawyers
21st-century women lawyers